Garfield Park may refer to:

East Garfield Park, Chicago, a City of Chicago community area
West Garfield Park, Chicago, a City of Chicago community area
Garfield Park (Chicago), a park in the East Garfield Park neighborhood of Chicago known for its conservatory
Garfield Park (Indianapolis), a park on the south side of Indianapolis known for its conservatory and sunken gardens
Garfield Park, a park in Garfield Heights, Ohio
Garfield Park, a playground in Washington, DC, under DPR (Department of Parks and Recreation), located at Third and G Streets SE (Ward 6)
Garfield Square, a park in the Mission District of San Francisco that is also known as Garfield Park 
Piatt Park, a park in Cincinnati, Ohio that is also known as Garfield Park
Three areas of Willingboro Township, New Jersey named Garfield Park, Garfield Park East, and Garfield North
A small park in Oakland, California
A park in Corvallis, Oregon